İkizdere District is a district of the Rize Province of Turkey. Its seat is the town of İkizdere. Its area is 855 km2, and its population is 6,409 (2021).

Composition
There is one municipality in İkizdere District:
 İkizdere

There are 29 villages in İkizdere District:

 Ayvalık (Kapse)
 Ballıköy (Anzer)
 Başköy
 Bayırköy (Kolyav)
 Çamlıkköy
 Çataltepe
 Cevizlik (Plakorum)
 Çiçekli
 Çifteköprü
 Demirkapı (Homeze)
 Dereköy
 Diktaş (İksenit)
 Eskice (Haya)
 Gölyayla (Kabahor)
 Güneyce (Varda)
 Gürdere (Etmone)
 Güvenköy
 Ihlamur
 Ilıcaköy (Vane)
 Kama
 Meşeköy (Petran)
 Ortaköy (Cimil)
 Rüzgarlı (Mize)
 Sivrikaya (Köhser)
 Şimşirli (Gomes)
 Tozköy (Mahura)
 Tulumpınar
 Yağcılar (Vilköy)
 Yerelma (Cavatoz)

References

Districts of Rize Province